Robot Holocaust is a 1987 post-apocalyptic science fiction film written and directed by Tim Kincaid, and produced by Charles Band.

Plot
After society was almost destroyed in a robot rebellion in 2033, the remnants are either slaves to the Dark One in the one city that remains or nomads in the outside world. Slaves either work to power the city or fight in death matches for the other slaves to watch and for the Dark One's entertainment. While the winner of these matches is promised a reward, they receive death instead. The games are used to weed out of the population the biggest and the strongest to prevent rebellion in New Terra, the last city on Earth.

Just outside New Terra (New York City), Neo, a drifter from the atomic-blasted wastelands and his klutzy robot sidekick arrive at a factory where slaves labor to fuel the Dark One's Power Station. He meets Deeja (Nadine Hart), who convinces him to help rescue her father. Her father is a scientist (Michael Downend) who has invented a device that can break the Dark One's control over the factory slaves. Gathering a motley crew of allies on the way, Neo and Deeja go to the Power Station to confront the Dark One's evil servants. They find her father's body has been forcibly linked to the Dark One and was beyond saving, forcing Neo to kill both the Dark One and Deeja's father. With the Dark One dead and the slaves are free, Deeja stays behind to continue her father's work while Neo returns to the wastelands with his robot sidekick.

Cast
 Norris Culf as Neo
 Nadine Hart as Deeja
 Joel Van Ornsteiner as Klyton
 Jennifer Delora as Nyla
 Andrew Howarth as Kai
 Angelika Jager as Valaria
 Michael Downend as Jorn
 Rick Gianasi as Torque
 George Gray as Bray
 Nicholas Reiner as Haimsa
 Michael Azzolina as Roan
 John Blaylock as Korla

Release
The film received a direct-to-video issuing in the United States nine months later by Wizard Video. In 2001, MGM released an Amazon Exclusive VHS.

MGM released the film in widescreen on Hulu. On November 29, 2018, Scorpion Releasing announced they would release the film on Blu-ray.

Reception
From contemporary reviews, a reviewer credited as "Lor." of Variety reviewed the Wizard Video VHS on January 8, 1987. "Lor." felt the film "lacks the production values and large-scale set-pieces required of a theatrical action pic, but is a suitable entry for home video fans." The review went on to note that "The Robot designs are intriguing" while the "Monsters are disappointing" noting the giant worms as hand puppets. while the acting was "mainly deadpan, except for the beautiful Angelika Jager, camping it up as the villainess."

The Creature Feature guide gave 1.5 out of 5 stars, saying that it was so bad only camp followers would enjoy it. The effects were cited as being especially bad. TV Guide states the movie combines worst elements of post-apocalyptic science fiction and sword-and-sorcery epics. As of August 2019, it has a 15% score on Rotten Tomatoes

Legacy
The film was featured during the first season of Mystery Science Theater 3000, after fans (along with Joel and the bots) complained about the lack of color films. This version was released on DVD by Shout Factory on December 4, 2012.

References

Sources

External links

Mystery Science Theater 3000 
 
 Episode guide: 110- Robot Holocaust (with short: Radar Men From The Moon--Episode 9, Battle in the Stratosphere)
 MST3K: Robot Holocaust (FULL MOVIE) - with Annotations on MYSTERY SCIENCE THEATER 3000 You Tube Channel

1987 films
1980s science fiction films
Empire International Pictures films
Films set in New York City
American robot films
American post-apocalyptic films
1980s English-language films
1980s American films
English-language science fiction films